BANG! is the debut U.S. album by German glam rock band Cinema Bizarre, released on August 25, 2009.

Singles
"I Came 2 Party" was confirmed to be the first single from the album. It was to be released in Europe on August 7, 2009, and on August 11, worldwide.

Track listing

Standard Edition

Promotion
The band toured with Lady Gaga in 2009 on her The Fame Ball Tour to promote ToyZ and BANG!.

References

External links

2009 albums
Cinema Bizarre albums